The Embassy of the United Kingdom in The Hague is the chief diplomatic mission of the United Kingdom in the Kingdom of the Netherlands. The Embassy is located on one of the most famous streets in the Netherlands, Lange Voorhout, in the Centrum. The current British Ambassador to the Netherlands is Joanna Roper.

Since the formation in 1997 of the Organisation for the Prohibition of Chemical Weapons (OPCW), which is located in The Hague, the British Ambassador to the Netherlands has also been the UK's Permanent Representative to the OPCW.

Outside The Hague, there is also a British Consulate General in Amsterdam where the senior officer is known as the Consul-General. The Embassy and Consulate General also represent the British Overseas Territories in the Netherlands.

See also
Netherlands–United Kingdom relations
List of diplomatic missions in the Netherlands
List of diplomats of the United Kingdom to the Netherlands

References

 

Hague
United Kingdom
Buildings and structures in The Hague
Netherlands–United Kingdom relations